David Cobb (born June 3, 1993) is a former American football running back. He played college football at Minnesota. He was drafted by the Tennessee Titans in the fifth round of the 2015 NFL Draft. He has also been a member of the Pittsburgh Steelers and Chicago Bears of the National Football League, the Saskatchewan Roughriders of the Canadian Football League, and the San Antonio Commanders of the Alliance of American Football.

Early years
Cobb attended Ellison High School in Killeen, Texas. During his career rushed for 2,946 yards and 35 touchdowns. Cobb was a three-star recruit by Rivals.com. He signed to play college football at the University of Minnesota after National Signing Day in February 2011.

College career
Cobb played in eight games his freshman and sophomore seasons, combining to rush for 65 yards on 11 carries. As a junior in 2013, Cobb played in 13 games with seven starts and led the team with 1,202 yards on 237 carries with seven touchdowns. He became the first Golden Gophers running back to rush for 1,000 yards since Amir Pinnix in 2006. Cobb returned as the starter his senior season in 2014. During the season, he broke Laurence Maroney's school record for rushing yards in a season. He finished the season with 1,626 yards on 314 carries with 13 touchdowns.

Statistics
Source:

Professional career

Tennessee Titans
The Tennessee Titans selected Cobb in the fifth round (138th pick overall) of the 2015 NFL Draft. On September 6, 2015, Cobb was placed on injured reserve with a designation to return. On November 11, 2015, Cobb was activated to the 53-man roster. On  January 3, 2016, Cobb recorded his first touchdown of his career against the Indianapolis Colts. Cobb also ran for a career-high 73 yards on 19 carries.

The Titans released Cobb on August 30, 2016. Cobb ended his tenure with the Titans with 146 rushing yards on 52 carries. He appeared in seven games, but only started in one.

Pittsburgh Steelers
On September 7, 2016, the Pittsburgh Steelers signed Cobb to their practice squad. On October 11, 2016, Cobb was released from the Steelers' practice squad.

Chicago Bears
On October 25, 2016, Cobb was signed to the Bears' practice squad. He signed a reserve/future contract with the Bears on January 3, 2017.  On May 1, 2017, Cobb was waived by the Bears.

Saskatchewan Roughriders
Cobb participated in The Spring League in 2018, and as a result, signed with the Saskatchewan Roughriders of the CFL on June 4, 2018, in time for their final preseason game. After recording 2 rushes for 1 yard, Cobb was released on June 11. Cobb would go back to The Spring League again for their summer showcase.

San Antonio Commanders
In September 2018, Cobb was signed by the San Antonio Commanders of the Alliance of American Football for the 2019 season. In 8 games played prior to the AAF suspending operations, Cobb earned 137 yards on 35 rushes, and caught 3 passes for 11 yards. The league ceased operations in April 2019.

References

External links
Minnesota Golden Gophers bio
Tennessee Titans bio

1993 births
Living people
Sportspeople from Killeen, Texas
Players of American football from Texas
American football running backs
Minnesota Golden Gophers football players
Tennessee Titans players
Pittsburgh Steelers players
Chicago Bears players
San Antonio Commanders players